is a Japanese animation studio founded in 1998. It is currently a subsidiary of Bandai Namco Filmworks, which in turn is a subsidiary to Bandai Namco Holdings.

History
Actas was founded on July 6, 1998, by Hiroshi Katō and Jūtarō Ōba, who previously worked for Tatsunoko Production and Ashi Productions.

Following Katō's death in 2009, Shunpei Maruyama was named the new company president. The studio also had a subsidiary animation studio Karaku, but Actas merged it with the main company in July 2017.

In September 2017, Bandai Visual has announced that it had acquired Actas.

Works

TV series
 1999–2000: Gozonji! Gekko Kamen-kun
 2000–2001: Shin Megami Tensei: Devil Children
 2002–2003: Transformers: Armada
 2002–2003: Shin Megami Tensei: D-Children – Light & Dark
 2003–2004: Pluster World (with Brain's Base)
 2003–2004: Mermaid Melody Pichi Pichi Pitch (with SynergySP)
 2004: Mermaid Melody Pichi Pichi Pitch Pure (with SynergySP)
 2004: Transformers: Energon
 2005: Ginban Kaleidoscope; animated by Karaku
 2006: Tactical Roar
 2006: Night Head Genesis (with Bee Media)
 2007: Kotetsushin Jeeg
 2007: Moetan
 2007–2008: Mori no Sensha Bonolon
 2012–2013: Girls und Panzer
 2013: Da Capo III; credited as Kazami Gakuen Kōshiki Dōga-bu
 2016: Regalia: The Three Sacred Stars
 2016–2017: Long Riders!
 2017: Princess Principal (with 3Hz)
 2023: Hero Classroom

OVA/ONAs
 2000–2001: éX-Driver
 2001–2002: Ajimu - Kaigan Monogatari
 2002: éX-Driver: Danger Zone
 2003: Ai Shimai 2: Futari no Kajitsu
 2004–2006: Tales of Phantasia: The Animation
 2008: The Idolmaster Live For You!
 2008–2009: Switch
 2009–2010: Yutori-chan
 2010: Mayo Elle Otoko no Ko
 2011: Mazinkaizer SKL
 2012–2013: Girls und Panzer
 2014: Girls und Panzer: This Is the Real Anzio Battle!
 2015: Cyborg 009 VS Devilman (with Bee Media)

Films
 2002: éX-Driver: The Movie
 2010: Kowarekake no Orgel
 2015: Girls und Panzer der Film
 2017–present: Girls und Panzer das Finale
 2021–present: Princess Principal: Crown Handler

Notes

References

External links
  
 

 
Japanese companies established in 1998
Animation studios in Tokyo
Japanese animation studios
Mass media companies established in 1998
Bandai Namco Holdings subsidiaries
Suginami